This is a list of electoral results for the electoral district of Yarraville in Victorian state elections.

Members for Yarraville

Election results

Elections in the 1960s

 The two candidate preferred vote was not counted between the Labor and DLP candidates for Yarraville.

 The two candidate preferred vote was not counted between the Labor and DLP candidates for Yarraville.

Elections in the 1950s

 Two party preferred vote was estimated.

References

Victoria (Australia) state electoral results by district